David Michael Meggyesy (born November 1, 1941) is a former American football player, author, and union organizer. He played college football at Syracuse University, and was drafted in the 17th round of the 1963 NFL Draft by the St. Louis Cardinals, for whom he was a linebacker for seven seasons. He became involved in civil rights and anti-war activities while with the Cardinals. After leaving the team, he wrote Out of Their League, a controversial memoir about his experiences in football. He later taught courses in the sociology of sports, coached high school football, and became a union representative for the National Football League Players Association.

Early life and education
Meggyesy was born in Cleveland, Ohio, where his father was a machinist and union organizer. He is of Hungarian descent. When he was five his family moved to Glenwillow, Ohio, where, says Meggyesy, he "was, literally, raised on a pig farm next to a dynamite factory." At Solon High School, in Solon, Ohio, he played football and other sports. He then attended Syracuse University on an athletic scholarship.

During his early years in the NFL, Meggyesy was a graduate student in sociology at Washington University in St. Louis.

Post-NFL career
Meggyesy spent four months in 1970 at Jack Scott's Institute for the Study of Sport and Society in Oakland, California, where he wrote his bestselling memoir, Out of Their League. He was interviewed on the Dick Cavett show shortly before its publication. According to the San Jose Mercury News, the book was "the first critical look at the dehumanizing aspects of pro football." In 1973, Meggyesy was a co-founder of the Esalen Sports Center. After living in Colorado for several years, Meggesey's family returned to California. He began teaching courses at Stanford University, including Sports Consciousness and Social Change, and The Athlete and Society.

In 1980, while still teaching part-time at Stanford, he was hired as head football coach at Tamalpais High School, in Mill Valley, California. His son was one of three seniors on the varsity team, which had gone 2–8 the year before. In 1980, they were 0–11. Meggyesy later said, "We went 0-11, but it was a great experience to see them mature and gain confidence even when we were losing. High school football is football in its purest form. It struck me what a crucible for learning it was."

He was then hired by the National Football League Players Association (NFLPA) as Western Regional Director. He retired in 2007.

References

Further reading

External links
David Meggyesy, President, bio at Athletes United for Peace
David Meggyesy contributor profile at Integral Life

1941 births
Living people
American football linebackers
Trade unionists from Ohio
Syracuse Orange football players
St. Louis Cardinals (football) players
High school football coaches in California
Washington University in St. Louis alumni
Sportspeople from Cleveland
People from Mill Valley, California
People from Cuyahoga County, Ohio
Players of American football from Cleveland
American people of Hungarian descent